Borj may refer to:

Locations in Iran
 Borj-e Olya, East Azerbaijan Province
 Borj-e Sofla, East Azerbaijan Province
 Borj-e Dasht Darreh, Fars Province
 Borj-e Delbar, Fars Province
 Borj-e Khankaram, Fars Province
 Borj-e Safar Beg, Fars Province
 Borj-e Seyfollah, Fars Province
 Borj-e Seyyed, Fars Province
 Borj Sukhteh-ye Olya, Fars Province
 Borj Sukhteh-ye Sofla, Fars Province
 Borj, Fahraj, Kerman Province
 Borj, Ekhtiarabad, Kerman Province
 Borj-e Abbasabad, Kerman Province
 Borj, Khuzestan
 Borj-e Ali Shir-e Olya, Kohgiluyeh and Boyer-Ahmad Province
 Borj-e Ali Shir-e Sofla, Kohgiluyeh and Boyer-Ahmad Province
 Borj-e Bahmani, Kohgiluyeh and Boyer-Ahmad Province
 Borj, Markazi
 Borj-e Abbas Khan, Markazi Province
 Borj-e Balan, Markazi Province
 Borj-e Cheshmeh-ye Mahmud, Markazi Province
 Borj Qaqan, Markazi Province
 Borj-e Kheyl, Mazandaran Province
 Borj, North Khorasan (disambiguation)
 Borj, Bojnord
 Borj, Esfarayen
 Borj-e Aqa
 Borj-e Zanganlu
 Borj-e Zavalfaqar
 Borj, Razavi Khorasan
 Borj-e Qardash, Razavi Khorasan Province
 Borj-e Zeydanlu, Razavi Khorasan Province
 Borj-e Mirgol, Sistan and Baluchestan Province
 Borj-e Yusef, Sistan and Baluchestan Province
 Borj-e Mohammadan, South Khorasan Province
 Borj-e Ziad, South Khorasan Province

Fortresses in Morocco
Borj is a general name for historical fortifications on hilltops in Morocco.
 Borj Nord, a fortress near the town of Fez, Morocco

Locations in Lebanon
 Borj, Akkar District, Akkar Governate
 Borj Rahal, Tyre District, South Governate
 Borj Kalaway, Bint Jbeil District, Nabatieh Governate
 Borj el Chamali, Tyre District, South Governate